Taken At Midnight is a 2014 play by Mark Hayhurst on the life of Hans Litten, his cross-examination of Adolf Hitler in court in 1931 and his mother's attempts to secure his release after his arrest by the Nazis in 1933. Hayhurst also produced a television drama on the same topic in 2011, entitled The Man Who Crossed Hitler. Taken At Midnight is Hayhurst's theatre debut.

Production History 

It premiered in the Minerva Theatre at the Chichester Festival Theatre from 2 October 2014 (previews from 26 September) to 1 November 2014, directed by Jonathan Church and starring Penelope Wilton. It transferred to the Theatre Royal Haymarket in London, opening on 26 January 2015 (previews from 15 January) until 14 March 2015.

Characters and original cast 

Hans Litten - Martin Hutson
Irmgard Litten - Penelope Wilton
Carl von Ossietzky - Mike Grady
Erich Mühsam - Pip Donaghy
Dr. Conrad -John Light 
Fritz Litten - Allan Corduner
Gustav Hammerman - Marc Antolin
Lord Clifford Allen - David Yelland
SA Officer - Dermot McLaughlin
Hotelier - Christopher Hogben
Hitler's Voice - Roger Allam

Other parts were played by members of the company.

References

External links
https://web.archive.org/web/20140810162059/http://www.cft.org.uk/takenatmidnight

Fiction set in 1931
Fiction set in 1933
2014 plays
Cultural depictions of Adolf Hitler
Plays about Nazi Germany